Oliver Amani Mbekeka (born 22 August 1979) is a Ugandan football manager and former player who played as a forward. She has been a member of the Uganda women's national team.

Club career
Mbekeka has played for Kampala Women, City Stars and She Corporate in Uganda, for Source de Kivu and OCL City in the Democratic Republic of the Congo and for APR FC in Rwanda.

International career
Mbekeka capped for Uganda at senior level during the 2000 African Women's Championship and the 2002 African Women's Championship qualification. She has played in 12 international matches.

International goals
Scores and results list Uganda goal tally first

Controversy
After Uganda withdrew from the 2004 African Women's Championship qualification prior the preliminary round matches against Malawi, Mbekeka and fellow Ugandan footballer Annet Nakimbugwe moved abroad. Being in the Democratic Republic of the Congo, they were naturalized there as Oliva Amani and Annette Nshimire, respectively, and represented the country at the 2006 FIFA U-20 Women's World Championship. She ended up playing for the DR Congo at senior level during the 2006 African Women's Championship.

Managerial career
Mbekeka has coached Lady Doves Masindi in Uganda and the Uganda women's national under-20 football team.

References

External links

1979 births
Living people
Ugandan women's footballers
Uganda women's international footballers
Ugandan expatriate women's footballers
Ugandan expatriate sportspeople in the Democratic Republic of the Congo
Expatriate footballers in the Democratic Republic of the Congo
Ugandan expatriate sportspeople in Rwanda
Expatriate footballers in Rwanda
Ugandan football managers
Female association football managers
Women's association football managers
Democratic Republic of the Congo women's international footballers
Dual internationalists (women's football)
Women's association footballers not categorized by position